Bernadette Pajer is the author of the Professor Bradshaw Mysteries, whodunits set in her home of Washington State circa 1900, about a professor who applies his knowledge of the new science of electrical engineering to solve murders.

Biography 

Pajer is a long-time resident of the Pacific Northwest. Richard Bach,  author of Jonathan Livingston Seagull, inspired Bernadette to pursue her passion of writing. Pajer earned a Creative Writing Certificate from the University of Washington. In 2001 she decided to complete her pre-engineering bachelor's degree that she had started years earlier, but instead focused on Culture, Literature, and the Arts.

Pajer is a member of Mystery Writers of America, Sisters in Crime, Northwest Science Writers, and the Seattle7Writers.org. She lives in the Seattle area with her husband and son.

Anti-vaccination lobbying 

Pajer is a board member of Informed Choice Washington, an organization that opposes vaccination requirements in schools and daycare centers. Pajer lobbied against Washington State HB1638, a bill that banned personal exemptions to the MMR vaccine in the state.

Professor Bradshaw & Company 

Research and historical accuracy are hallmarks of Pajer's Professor Bradshaw Mysteries. Her "historical information has been thoroughly researched and not only fits well by layering setting–time and place–as a fundamental part of the mystery with clues popping up all over the place but Ms. Pajer has also captured the other two parts of her story very well... weaving all the parts (historical fiction, mystery and romance) together seamlessly." Pajer "doesn't just give the readers obvious details of setting; she digs a little deeper, works her research into the plot, and creates an immersive and enjoyable experience for the reader." 

Through the adventures of "the indefatigable Professor Bradshaw and his equally delightful cronies" Pajer explores the world of Seattle circa 1900 and she "underscores the contrast between early Seattle's rough and tumble side and its more genteel aspirations."  "The reader really gets a sense of a people and a country bursting with promise in a world that is quickly changing."

As for the characters, "Protagonist Professor Benjamin Bradshaw is such a warm-hearted and likeable character that readers cannot help but barrack for him. Equally charming are those near and dear to him – his curious son Justin, unrequited (?) love Missouri, her adventure seeking Uncle Henry and stalwart housekeeper Mrs Prouty."

In each book of the series, readers are introduced to various electrical inventions, such as the Tesla Coil, through the protagonist, Benjamin Bradshaw, a professor of electrical engineering at the University of Washington. While the books are character-driven, the scientific aspects of the stories are historically accurate and "she is also very good at explaining complex scientific concepts to the uninitiated."   "This ease of explanation (of electrical engineering concepts) is a testament to the amount of research Pajer has undertaken on the subject matter and time period."

Publications
 A Spark of Death (July 2011)
 Fatal Induction (May 2012)
 Capacity for Murder (June 2013)
 The Edison Effect (September 2014)

References

External links 
University of Washington, Bothell, Alumni Profiles, Bernadette Pajer
Washington Academy of Science Seal of Approval
www.bernadettepajer.com

Year of birth missing (living people)
Living people
Writers from Washington (state)
American anti-vaccination activists